Pierre Talmont (born 2 April 1977 in Vannes, France) is a French former professional footballer who played as a defender and became a coach after retiring as a player. He was appointed head coach of Vannes OC in June 2021, after six seasons with Saint-Colomban Sportive Locminé.

Talmont previously played for Vannes OC in Ligue 2. With Vannes he also played in the final of the 2008–09 Coupe de la Ligue.

Honours
Vannes
 Coupe de la Ligue: runner-up 2008–09

References

Living people
1977 births
Sportspeople from Morbihan
Association football defenders
French footballers
Vannes OC players
Stade Brestois 29 players
Gap HAFC players
Aviron Bayonnais FC players
Stade Lavallois players
Vendée Poiré-sur-Vie Football players
Footballers from Brittany
French football managers
Vannes OC managers
Brittany international footballers